The Centennial Cup is an annual ice hockey tournament organized by Hockey Canada and the Canadian Junior Hockey League (CJHL), which determines the national champion of junior A ice hockey. It is a ten-team round robin featuring the winners of all nine CJHL member leagues as well as a pre-selected host city.

The championship has also been known as the National Junior A Championship in 2019, it was formerly known as the Royal Bank Cup from 1996 to 2018 and the Manitoba Centennial Cup from 1971 to 1995. It is currently branded as the Centennial Cup presented by Tim Hortons for sponsorship reasons.

History
The Manitoba Centennial Trophy was presented to the Canadian Amateur Hockey Association (CAHA) by the Manitoba Amateur Hockey Association (MAHA) to commemorate their centennial year of 1970. At that time, the CAHA reconfigured their junior tiers, creating two separate classifications – Major junior and Junior A. The major junior teams were grouped into the three regional leagues that made up the Canadian Major Junior Hockey League (CMJHL), while the Junior A tier included the remaining junior teams in the provincial/regional leagues that later formed the Canadian Junior Hockey League. It was determined that the Memorial Cup, which had served as the CAHA's national championship tournament, would become the new championship trophy for the CMJHL while the Manitoba Centennial Trophy served as the trophy for the champions of the new Junior A division. Earl Dawson and Bill Addison were the named the initial trustees of the trophy, both of whom were past presidents of the MAHA. The tournament subsequently became known as the Centennial Cup.

From 1971 to 1978 and from 1982 to 1984, the Centennial Cup pitted the Abbott Cup champion (Western Canada) versus the Dudley Hewitt Cup champion (Eastern Canada). A three-team tournament format, splitting Eastern Canada into two regions, was introduced in 1979 and used until 1981. The Centennial Cup permanently moved back to the tournament format in 1986, with the addition of a predetermined host team to the field. It later expanded to a five-team tournament in 1990 when the Abbott Cup series was discontinued in favour of allowing both the ANAVET and Doyle Cup winners to advance to the national championship. For the 1996 tournament, the trophy gained a sponsor and became the Royal Bank Cup. The ANAVET and Doyle Cups were temporarily replaced by the Western Canada Cup, which determined the two Western seeds for the Royal Bank Cup, from 2013 to 2017. During this time, the Brooks Bandits of the Alberta Junior Hockey League won the 2013 Royal Bank Cup, where they had gained entry into the tournament as the Western Canada Cup runner-up making them the first team in Centennial Cup/Royal Bank Cup history to win the national championship without being the host or a regional champion.

Overtime is common as the Junior A championships with the longest game in the tournament's history started on May 12, 2007, at 2007 Royal Bank Cup between the Camrose Kodiaks of the Alberta Junior Hockey League and the host Prince George Spruce Kings of the British Columbia Hockey League. The Spruce Kings won the game 3–2 6:01 into the fifth overtime period. The game lasted 146:01, just short of the CJAHL record set by the Toronto Jr. Canadiens and the Pickering Panthers in the 2007 Ontario Provincial Junior A Hockey League playoffs (154:32).

After the 2018 Royal Bank Cup, Royal Bank of Canada ended their sponsorship agreement with the Canadian Junior Hockey League.  After going by the name National Junior A Championship in 2019, the CJHL and Hockey Canada reverted the title back to its original name — the Centennial Cup — for its 50th anniversary in 2020.  In December 2019, Tim Hortons was unveiled by Hockey Canada as the presenting sponsor for the Centennial Cup. The 2020 and 2021 tournaments were later cancelled due to the COVID-19 pandemic, the only times the championship has not been played since 1970.

Format
Starting in 1990, the tournament used a five-team round-robin followed by a playoff. The format for qualification of the participating teams was based on four regional champions and the host team.

Fred Page Cup: Eastern Champion
Dudley Hewitt Cup: Central Champion
ANAVET Cup: Western Champion
Doyle Cup: Pacific Champion
Host team: Predetermined by Canadian Junior Hockey League
Ahead of the 2022 Centennial Cup, the tournament's format was changed to include the winners of the nine member leagues of the CJHL: the Alberta Junior Hockey League (AJHL), Saskatchewan Junior Hockey League (SJHL), Manitoba Junior Hockey League (MJHL), Superior International Junior Hockey League (SIJHL), Northern Ontario Junior Hockey League (NOJHL), Ontario Junior Hockey League (OJHL), Central Canada Hockey League (CCHL), Quebec Junior Hockey League (LHJQ) and Maritime Junior A Hockey League (MHL) plus a host city pre-determined by the CJHL.

Champions by era

Manitoba Centennial Trophy history (1971–1995)
The Red Deer Rustlers of the Alberta Junior Hockey League defeated the Charlottetown Islanders of the Island Junior Hockey League in 1971 to claim the inaugural Canadian Junior A championship and Manitoba Centennial Trophy.

The 1972 Centennial Cup gained national attention when the Guelph CMC's of the Southern Ontario Junior A Hockey League were in the final game of a four-game sweep of the Red Deer Rustlers and their leading scorer Paul Fendley lost his helmet during a body check and struck his head on the ice, knocking him into a coma. The National Hockey League prospect regained consciousness and died two days later from head trauma.

The 1990 Centennial Cup marked the only year that the national championship was decided between two teams from the same province or league. The host Vernon Lakers defeated the New Westminster Royals 6–5 in overtime to win the national championship. Both teams were members of the British Columbia Junior Hockey League.

The final Centennial Cup from this era was awarded to the Calgary Canucks of the Alberta Junior Hockey League in 1995.

Note: Champions are in bold.

Royal Bank Cup history (1996–2018)
Every tournament in the Royal Bank Cup era was played as a round-robin tournament between five teams. In May 1996, the inaugural Royal Bank Cup was held in Melfort, Saskatchewan. The first winner of the Royal Bank Cup was the Vernon Vipers of the British Columbia Hockey League.

National Junior A Championship history (2019)
In 2018, the championship was renamed the National Junior A Championship after the Royal Bank of Canada dropped their sponsorship of the event.

Centennial Cup history (2020–present)
With the national championship scheduled to return to Manitoba for its 50th anniversary in 2020, Hockey Canada and the Canadian Junior Hockey League announced that the championship return to its original name, the Centennial Cup.

Most championships by province
Winners of the Centennial Cup (1971–1995), Royal Bank Cup (1996–2018), and National Junior A Championship (2019) by province.

The Pembroke Lumber Kings won the 2011 Royal Bank Cup, and became the first Central Canada Hockey League (CCHL) team to win the National Junior A Championship since the 1976 champion Rockland Nationals. In 2015, the Portage Terriers broke a 41-year-old drought for the Manitoba Junior Hockey League, being the first team win the Junior A championship since the 1974 Selkirk Steelers. The Maritimes provinces have only won two championships. To date, no teams from the Quebec Junior Hockey League, Superior International Junior Hockey League, or the Northern Ontario Junior Hockey League have won the Junior A championship.

Most championships by team

Winners of the Centennial Cup (1971–1995), Royal Bank Cup (1996–2018) and National Junior A Championship (2019–present) by team.

There has been a consecutive national champion on three occasions: the Prince Albert Raiders won in 1981 and 1982, while the Vernon Lakers/Vipers won in 1990 and 1991 (as the Lakers), and again in 2009 and 2010 (as the Vipers).

The Prince Albert Raiders also hold a record for appearing in the championship final three consecutive times, in 1977, 1978 and 1979. The Raiders also reached the national finals five times in six years (1977, 1978, 1979, 1981, 1982), while winning a total of four championships (1977, 1979, 1981, 1982) during that span. The Raiders moved up to Major Junior Western Hockey League after their 1982 Junior A championship, where they soon won the Memorial Cup for the major junior national championship in 1985.

Roland Mercier Trophy
The Roland Mercier Trophy is awarded to the Most Valuable Player of the National Junior A Championship.

1975 Ron Lecuyer — Spruce Grove Mets (AJHL)
1976 Gerry Leroux — Rockland Nationals (CJHL)
1977 Barry Archibald — Prince Albert Raiders (SJHL)
1978 Terry Cullen — Guelph Platers (OPJHL)
1979 Dunston Carroll — Sherwood-Parkdale Metros (IJHL)
1980 Brent Sutter — Red Deer Rustlers (AJHL)
1981 James Patrick — Prince Albert Raiders (SJHL)
1982 Carl Van Camp — Prince Albert Raiders (SJHL)
1983 Dennis McCarroll — North York Rangers (OJHL)
1984 Ron Amyotte — Weyburn Red Wings (SJHL)
1985 Adam Lewis — Orillia Travelways (OJHL)
1986 Kevan Melrose — Penticton Knights (BCJHL)
1987 Frank Romeo — Richmond Sockeyes (BCJHL)
1988 Rod Brind'Amour — Notre Dame Hounds (SJHL)
1989 Todd Henderson — Thunder Bay Flyers (USHL)
1990 Marc Alain Duchaine — Longueuil Collège Français (QPJHL)
1991 Andrew Backen — Thunder Bay Flyers (USHL)
1992 Scott Longstaff — Vernon Lakers (BCHL)
1993 Steffon Walby — Kelowna Packers (BCHL)
1994 Tyler Graham — Olds Grizzlys (AJHL)
1995 Mitch Grant — Winnipeg South Blues (MJHL)
1996 Serge Bourgeois — Moncton Beavers (MJAHL)
1997 Matt Hartigan – Weyburn Red Wings (SJHL)
1998 Peter Wishloff — South Surrey Eagles (BCHL)
1999 Dennis Bassett — Yorkton Terriers (SJHL)
2000 Serge Dube — Rayside-Balfour Sabrecats (NOJHL)
2001 Darrell Stoddard — Camrose Kodiaks (AJHL)
2002 Jeff Tambellini — Chilliwack Chiefs (BCHL)
2003 Craig Olynick — Humboldt Broncos (SJHL)
2004 Kevin Dziaduck — Kindersley Klippers (SJHL)
2005 Travis Friedley — Camrose Kodiaks (AJHL)
2006 David Wilson — Streetsville Derbys (OPJHL)
2007 Daniel Michalsky — Aurora Tigers (OPJHL)
2008 Darcy Findlay — Cornwall Colts (CJHL)
2009 Kyle Bigos — Vernon Vipers (BCHL)
2010 Shane Luke — Dauphin Kings (MJHL)
2011 Dalyn Flette — Camrose Kodiaks (AJHL)
2012 John Kleinhans — Soo Thunderbirds (NOJHL)
2013 Cam Maclise — Brooks Bandits (AJHL)
2014 Mike Stiliadis — Dauphin Kings (MJHL)
2015 Brad Bowles — Portage Terriers (MJHL)
2016 Cale Makar — Brooks Bandits (AJHL)
2017 Cale Makar — Brooks Bandits (AJHL)
2018 Will Calverley — Chilliwack Chiefs (BCHL)
2019 Francis Boisvert — Ottawa Jr. Senators (CCHL)
2022  Carson Cherepak —  Dauphin Kings (MJHL)

Game scoring records
Records included in this section took place in either Royal Bank Cup and Manitoba Centennial Cup tournament games and Manitoba Centennial Cup National Final Series games only.
Most Goals by Both Teams:
Notre Dame Hounds 9 – Thunder Bay Flyers 7 (1988 Centennial Cup) (16)
Vernon Lakers 11 – Nipawin Hawks 5 (1990 Centennial Cup) (16)
Halifax Oland Exports 9 – Ottawa Jr. Senators 7 (2002 Royal Bank Cup) (16)
Fewest Goals by Both Teams:
Selkirk Steelers 1 – Smiths Falls Bears 0 OT (1974 Centennial Cup) (1)
Wellington Dukes 1 – Charlottetown Abbies 0 OT (2003 Royal Bank Cup) (1)
Humboldt Broncos 1 – Camrose Kodiaks 0 (2008 Royal Bank Cup) (1)
Most Goals by Single Team:
Orillia Travelways 11 – Aurora Tigers 3 (1985 Centennial Cup) (11)
Vernon Lakers 11 – Nipawin Hawks 5 (1990 Centennial Cup) (11)
Olds Grizzlys 11 – Chateauguay Elites 3 (1994 Centennial Cup) (11)
Melfort Mustangs 11 – Vernon Vipers 3 (1996 Royal Bank Cup) (11)
Brockville Braves 11 – Oakville Blades 2 (2010 Royal Bank Cup) (11)
Largest Spread in a Game:
New Westminster Royals 9 – Amherst Ramblers 0 (1990 Centennial Cup) (9)
Thunder Bay Flyers 10 – Winkler Flyers 1 (1992 Centennial Cup) (9)
Olds Grizzlys 10 – Antigonish Bulldogs 1 (1994 Centennial Cup) (9)
Brockville Braves 11 – Oakville Blades 2 (2010 Royal Bank Cup) (9)
Biggest Shutout Victory:
New Westminster Royals 9 – Amherst Ramblers 0 (1990 Centennial Cup)
Longest Overtime Game:
Prince George Spruce Kings 3 – Camrose Kodiaks 2 5OT (146:01 Mins total) (2007 Royal Bank Cup)

References

External links
Centennial Cup website

Ice hockey tournaments in Canada
Canadian ice hockey trophies and awards
 
Recurring sporting events established in 1970
1970 establishments in Canada
Hockey Canada
Tim Hortons